Acraea toruna is a butterfly in the family Nymphalidae. It is found in south-western Uganda, Rwanda and the Democratic Republic of the Congo (Ituri and Kivu).

Description
Very close to Acraea johnstoni q.v. for differences.

Taxonomy
See Pierre & Bernaud, 2014

References

External links

Images representing  Acraea toruna at Bold

Butterflies described in 1900
toruna
Butterflies of Africa
Taxa named by Henley Grose-Smith